il manifesto  (English: "the manifesto") is an Italian language daily newspaper published in Rome, Italy. While it calls itself communist, it is not connected to any political party.

History and profile
il manifesto was founded as a monthly review in 1969 by a collection of left-wing journalists engaged in the wave of critical thought and activity on the Italian left in that period. Its founders included Luigi Pintor, Valentino Parlato, Lucio Magri and Rossana Rossanda. In April 1971, it became a daily. Although critical of the Italian Communist Party (PCI), it was popular with many party supporters who saw it as more lively and independent than the party newspaper l'Unità.

The 1991 PCI dissolution that gave birth to the social democratic Democratic Party of the Left was not followed by il manifesto, a paper which maintains positions closer to those of robustly left-wing parties such as the Communist Refoundation Party while remaining independent.

il manifesto is known in Italy for its bitter and sarcastic headlines, puns and clever choice of photographs. For example, the day of the election of Pope Benedict XVI, the first page of il manifesto featured a large photo of the newly elected pope along with the title "the German shepherd". It has included the satirical drawings of Vauro.

Valentino Parlato served as the editor-in-chief of the daily. Its directors are now Norma Rangeri and Tommaso di Francesco.

On 21 December 2000, the newspaper's office in Rome was the target of a bomb attack by Andrea Insabato, a neo-fascist with past ties to the Nuclei Armati Rivoluzionari and Terza Posizione. Andrea was seriously injured when the bomb detonated prematurely: he was the attack's only casualty.

One of its reporters, Giuliana Sgrena, was kidnapped by Iraqi insurgents in February 2005 and released on 4 March. A controversy erupted when her rescue vehicle was shot by American troops, killing an Italian security agent. Throughout its history, eminent Italian literary personalities have contributed to the newspaper such as the satirical poet Stefano Benni, the novelist Erri De Luca and the novelist, philosopher and linguist Umberto Eco.

Financial problems
By the late 2000s, state aid to media in Italy was dropping and il manifesto began to operate at a loss. It was owned by a cooperative of journalists until entering legal liquidation in February 2012. However, it continued to publish. The cooperative announced a subscription campaign to buy back the brand, which was successful in July 2016.

Circulation
il manifesto had a circulation of 24,728 copies in 2008, 22,140 copies in 2009 and 18,978 copies in 2010. Its circulation fell to 10,516 by 2014.

Editors-in-chief 
 Luigi Pintor (28 April 1971 – 19 September 1975)
 Valentino Parlato (19 September 1975 – 18 February 1976)
 Luigi Pintor, Luciana Castellina, Pino Ferraris, Vittorio Foa, Valentino Parlato & Rossana Rossanda (18 February 1976 – 3 July 1976)
 Luciana Castellina, Valentino Parlato & Rossana Rossanda (3 July 1976 – 2 March 1978)
 Valentino Parlato (2 March 1978 – November 1985)
 Rina Gagliardi & Mauro Paissan (November 1985 – November 1986)
 Valentino Parlato (January 1988 – July 1990)
 Sandro Medici (July 1990 – November 1991)
 Luigi Pintor (November 1991 – October 1995)
 Valentino Parlato (October 1995 – March 1998)
 Riccardo Barenghi (March 1998 – December 2003)
 Mariuccia Ciotta & Gabriele Polo (December 2003 – June 2009)
 Valentino Parlato (June 2009 – 4 May 2010)
 Norma Rangeri (since 4 May 2010)

References

External links
 il manifesto homepage 

1969 establishments in Italy
Cooperatives in Italy
Communist newspapers
Daily newspapers published in Italy
Failed terrorist attempts in Italy
Far-left politics in Italy
Italian-language newspapers
Media cooperatives
Neo-fascist attacks in Italy
Newspapers published in Rome
Publications established in 1969